Oscar B. Jackson Jr. (born July 9, 1947) is an American civil servant from the state of Oklahoma. Jackson is the current Oklahoma Secretary of Human Resources and Administration, having served in that position since he was appointed by Governor of Oklahoma David Walters in 1991.  With almost twenty years of continuous service, Jackson is the longest serving Cabinet Secretary in State history.

Since his appointment, Jackson has served under three different Governors spanning both political parties: Democrat David Walters, Republican Frank Keating, and Democrat Brad Henry.  Republican Governor-elect Mary Fallin has announced that she will retain Jackson in that position under her Administration.

In addition to his service as Human Resources and Administration Secretary, Jackson serves concurrently as the Administrator of the Oklahoma Office of Personnel Management.

Biography
Jackson has a bachelor's degree in Business Education from the University of Oklahoma, and has completed graduate work in Public Administration, with an emphasis in public personnel administration. In 2005, he was selected as an inaugural member of the University of Oklahoma College of Education Alumni Hall of Fame.

Secretary of Human Resources and Administration
In 1991, Jackson was appointed Secretary of Human Resources by Democratic Governor of Oklahoma David Walters. Jackson has since remained in that position under two more administrations: Frank Keating (1995–2003) and Brad Henry (2003 – 2011). At the same time, Jackson was appointed by Governor Walters to serve as the Administrator of the Oklahoma Office of Personnel Management, having him direct control over that Office. Both Keating and Henry retained Jackson in that position as well.

Jackson was one of three Cabinet Secretaries appointed by former Governor Frank Keating to be held over by Governor Brad Henry, the others being: Health and Human Services Secretary Howard Hendrick and Veterans Affairs Secretary Norman Lamb.

As the Secretary, Jackson is charged with providing comprehensive administrative and human resource services to all state agencies and employees, such as overseeing all purchasing, the state motor fleet, state building construction and maintenance, and state employee salaries, benefits and employment securities. He has supervision over the Oklahoma Office of Personnel Management.

On November 22, 2010 Governor-elect Mary Fallin announced that she would retain Secretary Jackson in both of his positions as Cabinet Secretary and as OPM Administrator.

References

External links
Oklahoma Governor's Cabinet

1947 births
Living people
State cabinet secretaries of Oklahoma
Heads of Oklahoma state agencies
University of Oklahoma alumni